The Solihull Metropolitan Borough Council elections were held on Thursday, 2 May 1991, with one third of the council as well as a double vacancy in St. Alphege to be elected. There had been a by-election in the interim, with the Independent Ratepayers & Residents gaining a seat in Shirley West from the Conservatives. The council fell to no overall control for the first time since its creation in 1973. Voter turnout was 46.0%.

Election result

|- style="background-color:#F9F9F9"
! style="background-color: " |
| Independent Ratepayers & Residents 
| align="right" | 2
| align="right" | 1
| align="right" | 0
| align="right" | +1
| align="right" | 11.1
| align="right" | 8.3
| align="right" | 5,956
| align="right" | +1.2%
|-

This result had the following consequences for the total number of seats on the council after the elections:

Ward results

|- style="background-color:#F6F6F6"
! style="background-color: " |
| colspan="2"   | Independent Ratepayers hold 
| align="right" | Swing
| align="right" | +2.7
|-

|- style="background-color:#F6F6F6"
! style="background-color: " |
| colspan="2"   | Independent Ratepayers gain from Conservatives
| align="right" | Swing
| align="right" | +1.8
|-

References

1991 English local elections
1991
1990s in the West Midlands (county)